Bucculatrix fusicola is a moth in the family Bucculatricidae. It is found in North America, where it has been recorded from Florida, Maine and Ohio. The species was described in 1920 by Annette Frances Braun.

References

Natural History Museum Lepidoptera generic names catalog

Bucculatricidae
Moths described in 1920
Moths of North America
Taxa named by Annette Frances Braun